A brand community is a concept in marketing and consumer research which postulates that human beings form communities on the basis of attachment to a brand or marque. A brand community refers to structured social relationships in which participants share admiration and connection of a brand that they experience through shared rituals, traditions and a sense of responsibility towards other members. The term often refers to the intersection between brand, individual identity and culture.

Origin 
The term "brand community" was first presented by Albert Muniz Jr. and Thomas C. O'Guinn in a 1995 paper for the Association for Consumer Research Annual Conference in Minneapolis, MN. In a 2001 article titled " Brand Community", they defined the concept as "a specialized, non-geographically bound community, based on a structured set of social relations among admirers of a brand." This 2001 paper recently has been acknowledged by Thomson Scientific & Healthcare to be one of the most cited papers in the field of economics and business.

Description 
Brand community members develop connections with like-minded individuals by sharing appreciation, lifestyle and meanings meanings associated with a particular brand. Brands can be seen as relationship builders that consumers use to relate with each other and with brands in order to seek the consensus of affective link and emotional support. Among the concepts developed to explain the behavior of consumers, the concept of a brand community focuses on the interconnections and relationships between consumers. Whereas contemporary marketing logic, as derived from economics, study the firm as a separate entity from customers, consumer researchers argue that customers can be active cocreators together with firms.

A brand community can be defined as an enduring self-selected group of actors sharing a system of values, standards and representations (a culture) and recognizing bonds of membership with each other and with the whole. Many brands provide examples of brand communities. In computers and electronics: Apple Inc. (Macintosh, iPod, iPhone), Holga and LOMO cameras, and Palm and Pocket PC Ultra-Mobile PCs. In vehicles: Ford Bronco, Jeep, Miata, Mini Cooper, Saab, Saturn and Subaru automobiles, and Royal Enfield and Harley-Davidson motorcycles. In toys: Barbie and Lego.

Variants  
There are several concepts that are directly related to brand communities

 Consumer tribes or brand tribes refer to ephemeral and impermanent groups that lack structured hierarchy and organized leadership. Building on the notion of neotribalism, consumer tribes as “a fluid group of people who share ephemeral experiences based on a particular product, service, brand or consumption activity” that enable communal experiences of consumption.
 Subcultures of consumption infer social orders or subcultures that endure through interpersonal connections, rituals, and sets of beliefs that can preclude other social affiliations, thus impacting on the identity of participants.
 Community of Style refers to a community formed on the basis of attachment to a combination of brands. In contrast to brand community, where communal social interaction is formed between members because of a shared interest in one particular brand, the concept of community of style illustrates how community emerge when the combining of brands.

References 

Types of communities
Consumer behaviour